.455 Webley  is a British handgun cartridge, most commonly used in the Webley top break revolvers Marks I through VI. It is also known as ".455 Eley" and ".455 Colt".

The .455 cartridge was a service revolver cartridge, featuring a rimmed cartridge firing a .45-caliber bullet at the relatively low velocity of 650 ft/s (190 m/s). The result was a cartridge and handgun combination with comparatively mild recoil. The .455 MK III "cupped" cartridge was rated superior to the .45 Colt in stopping power in the disputed United States Thompson-LaGarde Tests of 1904 that resulted in the adoption by the U.S. of the .45 ACP cartridge.

The .455 Webley cartridge remained in service with British and Commonwealth forces until the end of the Second World War.

Variants
Six main types of .455 ammunition were produced:

 .455 Webley Mk I [11.55×21.7mmR]: Introduced in 1891. 265 grain (17.2 g) solid lead round-nosed bullet propelled by black powder. All subsequent .455 designs used cordite propellant. In 1894 some Mark I cartridges were loaded with cordite (identified by a case cannelure and "C" headstamp) but it was found combustion was more efficient in a shorter case.
 .455 Webley Mk II [11.55×19.3mmR]: Introduced in 1897. 265 grain (17.2 g) solid lead round-nosed bullet propelled by  cordite. With the change to cordite propellant, case lengths were reduced. There are minor differences between the Mk I and II bullet shape, though these concern the internal dimensions and so are not immediately apparent.
 (1900-1912) Replaced the Mk III until it was replaced by the Mk IV. The bullet is made of a 12:1 ratio lead-tin alloy.
 (1914-1939) Replaced the Mk V until it was replaced by the Mk VI. The bullet is made of a 99% lead and 1% antimony alloy.
 .455 Webley Mk III [11.55×19.3mmR]: Introduced in 1898. The famous "Manstopper" bullet intended for police, civilian and colonial use. Essentially, the Mk III was a 218 grain lead "hollowpoint" design, propelled by cordite. The cylindrical bullet had hemispherical hollows at each end—one to seal the barrel, the other to deform on impact. This bullet was soon prohibited for use by the military because it was not compliant with the Hague Convention of 1899. The Mark III was withdrawn from service in 1900 and the Mark II was reintroduced.
 .455 Webley Mk IV [11.55×19.3mmR]: Introduced in 1912. 220 grain, flat-nosed wadcutter with cordite propellant. Designed with the goal of producing a more effective bullet than the Mark II without violating the terms of the Hague Convention.
 .455 Webley Mk V [11.55×19.3mmR]: Introduced in 1914. Identical to the Mk IV bullet, but cast from a harder lead-alloy containing more antimony with cordite propellant. This cartridge was only in use from April to November 1914. Upon its withdrawal the Mark II cartridge was returned to service. Remaining stocks were designated for target practice and unloaded cases were loaded with Mark II bullets.
 .455 Webley Mk VI [11.55×19.3mmR]: Introduced in 1939. A 265-grain full-metal-jacketed bullet intended for military purposes, designed to comply with the Hague Conventions. This cartridge was used during World War II. The propellant was  cordite or  nitro-cellulose. Cordite-loaded cartridges bear a "VI" on the headstamp while nitrocellulose-loaded cartridges are indicated with a "VIz".

In addition to the Webley revolvers, the British and Canadian armies also ordered several thousand Smith & Wesson .44 Hand Ejector revolvers, chambered in .455 Webley, in a rush to equip their troops for the Great War.  The urgency was such that the earliest of these were converted from revolvers already completed and chambered for .44 Special. Approximately 60,000 Colt New Service revolvers were also purchased, in .455.

The Italian firm Fiocchi and American firm Hornady are currently the only commercial manufacturers of the .455 Webley cartridge (in Mk II). Hornady, RCBS and Lee produce equipment for reloading .455 Webley cartridges.

.455 Webley Auto
The .455 Webley Auto Mk I cartridge was produced from 1913 to about the middle of World War II. This is a semi-rimmed cartridge for the Webley & Scott Self Loading pistols.

The early version of the cartridge (c.1904) had a shorter 21.7mm semi-rimmed case with a narrow rim and a pointed bullet. A later improved version of the cartridge (c.1910) was similar except it had a 23.54mm long case and a round-nosed bullet. The Mk 1 service round (c.1913) was identical to the 1910 version of the cartridge except it had a thicker rim.

The Mk 1 cartridge's bullet headspaced on the rim.  It was loaded with a 224 grain cupro-nickel-jacketed bullet with a muzzle velocity of 700 feet per second.
Various sub machine guns were tested using this cartridge however none were adopted.

World War One use
The Webley & Scott pistol was sold to the Royal Flying Corps and Royal Navy during World War I. There were also some Colt M1911 pistols chambered in .455 Auto  purchased by the Royal Navy. Although not a standard sidearm or a standard service cartridge, a few Colt M1911 "British service models" chambered in .455 Auto were sold commercially to British navy and army officers through outfitters. The service ammunition came packed in seven-round boxes stamped "not for revolvers" to prevent confusion.

.476 Enfield
Despite the apparent difference in caliber name, .476 Enfield was quite similar to the .455 Webley. The .476 had a  shorter case than the .455 Mark I and could be fired in weapons regulated and marked as safe for the caliber, such as the Webley "WG Army" model. This had a cylinder that was long enough to accommodate the significantly longer cartridge in which the bullet swelled out to .476" beyond the case. It would not chamber in any government-issue .455 Webley Marks I–VI.  The .450 Adams (1868), .476 Enfield (1881), and .455 Webley Mk.I (1891) British service cartridges all featured a case diameter of .476 inch [12.09mm].

See also
 Table of handgun and rifle cartridges

Notes

References 
 Barnes, Frank C., ed. by John T. Amber. ".476 Eley/.476 Enfield Mk-3", in Cartridges of the World, pp. 175 & 178. Northfield, IL: DBI Books, 1972. .
 Maze, Robert J. Howdah to High Power. Tucson, AZ: Excalibur Publications, 2002. .
 Wilson, R. K. Textbook of Automatic Pistols, p. 228. Plantersville, SC: Small Arms Technical Publishing Company, 1943.

External links

 "Those Confusing .455s" by Chris Punnett—Additional information on the .455 Webley cartridge

Military cartridges
Pistol and rifle cartridges
British firearm cartridges
Rimmed cartridges